Lifan may refer to:

Lifan Group, Chinese motorcycle and automobile manufacturer
Lifan Yuan, agency in the Qing government for the administration of Mongolian and Tibetan Affairs
Chongqing Lifan, Chinese football club